On the Fringe is an 2022 Spanish-Belgian thriller and social drama film directed by Juan Diego Botto from a screenplay by Botto and Olga Rodríguez. It stars Penélope Cruz, Luis Tosar, Adelfa Calvo, and Christian Checa.

Plot 
A homage to the Plataforma de Afectados por la Hipoteca, the plot revolves around the life of Rafa, a lawyer-activist set on helping people facing home eviction and who put his commitment to lost causes before his family, formed by wife Helena and stepson Raúl. Over the course of 24 dramatic hours, Rafa's story intertwines with those of Azucena (a retail cashier living with Manuel about to lose her home), and Teodora (an old woman who has lost her home in the wake of providing monetary guarantee to her son).

Cast

Production 
On the Fringe is Juan Diego Botto's debut as a feature film director. The screenplay was penned by Botto himself together with Olga Rodríguez. In addition to starring in the film Penélope Cruz also took over production duties alongside Morena Films's Álvaro Longoria. The film was produced by Morena Films alongside On The Fringe AIE and Panache Productions / La Compagnie Cinematographique with the participation of Amazon Prime Video and RTVE, funding from Eurimages, and support from Ayuntamiento de Madrid. Shooting locations included Madrid and Alcorcón. It features dialogue in Spanish and Arabic.

Release 
The film was selected for screening at the 79th Venice International Film Festival's Horizons section. It also screened at the 70th San Sebastián International Film Festival. Distributed by Vértice Cine, it was slated for a 30 September 2022 theatrical release in Spain, then re-scheduled to 7 October 2022. It will later stream on Amazon Prime Video.

Reception 

Wendy Ide of ScreenDaily deemed the film to be "pacey, propulsive stuff" in which the helmer "combines a social conscience with a thriller's sense of mounting pressure".

Mirito Torreiro of Fotogramas rated the film 4 out of 5 stars, highlighting the honesty of the proposal as the best thing about the film, otherwise praising the "impressive acting works" that Botto obtained from Tosar and Cruz, which result into something "dazzling and touching".

Raquel Hernández Luján of HobbyConsolas rated the "well-documented, painfully realistic and very humane film" with 70 points ("good") singling out Calvo's character and performance as the best thing about the film, while citing some "some overly forced characterizations and unsubtle messages" as negative elements.

Toni Vall of Cinemanía rated Botto's "very interesting" debut film 3½ stars, declaring himself to feel most interested by the paradoxical theme of the depiction of that kind of people going out of their way to help strangers while at the same time being a disaster with those closest to them, rather than by the depiction of the wider horrible reality about house evictions.

Accolades 

|-
| rowspan = "2" align = "center" | 2022 || rowspan = "2" | 28th Forqué Awards || Best Film Actor || Luis Tosar ||  || rowspan = "2" | 
|-
| colspan = "2" | Cinema and Education in Values || 
|-
| rowspan = "11" align = "center" | 2023 || rowspan = "2" | 10th Feroz Awards || Best Actor in a Film || Luis Tosar ||  || rowspan = "2" | 
|-
| Best Supporting Actress in a Film || Adelfa Calvo || 
|-
| rowspan = "2" | 78th CEC Medals || Best New Director || Juan Diego Botto ||  || rowspan = "2" align = "center" | 
|-
| Best New Actor || Christian Checa || 
|-
| rowspan = "5" | 37th Goya Awards || Best New Director || Juan Diego Botto ||  || rowspan = "5" | 
|-
| Best Actor || Luis Tosar || 
|-
| Best Supporting Actress || Penélope Cruz || 
|-
| Best New Actor || Christian Checa || 
|-
| Best Original Song || "En los márgenes" by Eduardo Cruz and María Rozalén ||  
|-
| rowspan = "2" | 31st Actors and Actresses Union Awards || Best Film Actress in a Minor Role || Adelfa Calvo ||  || rowspan = "2" | 
|-
| Best New Actor || Christian Checa || 
|}

See also 
 List of Spanish films of 2022

References 

Spanish thriller films
Belgian thriller films
Films shot in Madrid
Films shot in the Community of Madrid
2022 directorial debut films
2020s Spanish films
2020s Spanish-language films
Morena Films films
Social realism in film